Ammerön is the 19th biggest island in Sweden. It is located in the lake Revsundssjön.

References

Lake islands of Sweden
Islands of Jämtland County